Joseph Story  was an 18th-century Anglican priest in Ireland.

The son of another Joseph Story Bishop of Kilmore from 1742 to 1757 He was educated at Trinity College, Dublin. Story was ordained deacon on 28 August 1743 and priest on 4 September that year.

He was appointed 
 Archdeacon of Kilmore in 1745
 Vicar general of the Diocese of Kilmore in 1746
 Vicar of Killersherdiny in 1754
 and in 1560 Prebend of Whitechrch in Ferns Cathedral 
 
He died on 17 December 1767.

References

18th-century Irish Anglican priests
Archdeacons of Kilmore
1767 deaths
Alumni of Trinity College Dublin